Pirmammad Aliyev (born 2 November 1997) is a Kazakhstani individual and synchronised trampoline gymnast, representing his nation at international competitions. He competed at world championships, including at the 2014 and 2015 Trampoline World Championships.

Personal
He studied sport at the Kazakh Academy of Sport and Tourism in Almaty.

References

External links
 

1997 births
Living people
Kazakhstani male trampolinists
Olympic gymnasts of Kazakhstan
Gymnasts at the 2014 Summer Youth Olympics
Gymnasts at the 2016 Summer Olympics
Asian Games medalists in gymnastics
Asian Games bronze medalists for Kazakhstan
Medalists at the 2018 Asian Games
Gymnasts at the 2014 Asian Games
Gymnasts at the 2018 Asian Games
People from Shymkent